Regional elections were held in some regions of Italy during 1998. These included:

Aosta Valley on 31 May
Friuli-Venezia Giulia on 14 June
Trentino-Alto Adige on 22 November

Elections in Italian regions
1998 elections in Italy